Sonatikuri High School is a secondary educational school, situated in Sonatikuri, Naoda in Murshidabad district of Indian state West Bengal.

See also
Education in India
List of schools in India
Education in West Bengal

References

External links

High schools and secondary schools in West Bengal
Schools in Murshidabad district
Educational institutions established in 1972
1972 establishments in West Bengal